Prabir Roy (born 31 August 1948) is a Bengali producer, director, actor and a former Sheriff of Kolkata. He made his debut as a feature film maker with the film Kaal Madhumas.

Early life 

Roy is a commerce graduate from the University of Calcutta. He was a national level swimmer in his younger days. Grew up in a posh locality in South Kolkata. He has the distinction of introducing colour T.V. coverage in India in Feb-March, 1982 during the 1st Nehru Gold Cup. This was held at Eden Gardens, Kolkata in February 1982. The programme was covered with 5 on-line camera operation, long before Doordarshan started the same during the Delhi Asian Games in November 1982. This was inaugurated by Late Prime Minister Mrs Indira Gandhi.  He also produced "Ravishankar-A Legend of Glory". This programme represented Doordarshan in International T.V. Network Festival which was held in Miami, U.S.A. in September, 1984. It was Pt. Ravishankar's first Indian TV appearance.

Production and direction

T.V serials and feature films 
 Ravishankar-A Legend of Glory (3 episodes) – directed by Prabir Roy
 Soviet Circus (4 episodes) – directed by Prabir Roy
 Bichitra Tadanta (13 episodes) – directed by Inder Sen
 Grihadaha (13 episodes) – directed by Inder Sen
 Anya Galpo (DDK Commissioned) (4 episodes) – directed by Prabir Roy
 Bahiri (11 episodes) – directed by Bratati Chowdhury
 Harano Sur (DDK Commissioned) (4 episodes) – directed by Prabir Roy
 Sabdo Jabdo (6 episodes) – directed by Debraj Roy
 Ananda Bahar (12 episodes) – directed by Prabir Roy
 Panch Dashaker Romantic Juti (13 episodes) – directed by Bijon Chatterjee
 Nirjan Dupurer Premer Gaan (13 episodes) – directed by Bijon Chatterjee
 Jatak Kanya (13 episodes) – directed by Amal Sur
 Nrityer Tale Tale (53 episodes) – directed by Bratati Chowdhury
 Manik (586 episodes) – directed by Saibal Banerjee
 Kaal Madhumas (feature film) produced by K.N Sharma
 Jete Nahi Dibo (feature film) – produced by Royz Media and Entertainment

Adfilms and commercials 
 Calcutta Chemical
 Chesmi Glycerine Soap
 Bijoli Grill Nice Cream
 Bijoli Grill Ice Cream Soda
 Peerless Bazar
 Plus Phenyle
 Everest Phenyle

Corporate, telefilm and documentary 
 Kitply
 Rabindranath O Tripura
 Samsan Chapa – Directed by Bratati Chowdhury & Prabir Roy (For Etv-Bangla)
 Mahamaya- Directed by Prabir Roy (For Aakash Bangla)
 Tyag- Directed by Rana Bannerjee (For Aakash Bangla)

Acting 
 Ajker Nayak
 Ek Din Surja
 Rabibar
 Nayan Shyama
 IF
 Ajkal Porshur Golpo 
 Notun Surja
 Janmabhoomi (T.V Serial)
 Samparka(T.V Serial)
 Abhinetri (T.V Serial)
 Harano Sur (T.V Serial)
 Bichitra Tadanta (T.V Serial)
 Sabdo Jabdo (T.V Serial)

Awards and recognition 
 Pramathesh Barua Award
 Uttam Kumar Award
 Bijitra Tadanta was judged the best TV Serial in Eastern India in 1987
 Grihadaha was judged the best TV Serial in Eastern India in 1988
 Prabir Roy, the lead actor in film Nayan Shyama, went to British Film Institute (BFI)

References

Living people
Male actors in Bengali cinema
1948 births
Bengali film directors
Bengali film producers
Film producers from Kolkata
University of Calcutta alumni
Sheriffs of Kolkata